Chewa (also known as Nyanja) is a Bantu language spoken in Malawi and a recognised minority in Zambia and Mozambique. In Malawi, the name was officially changed from Chinyanja to Chichewa in 1968 at the insistence of President Hastings Kamuzu Banda (himself of the Chewa people), and this is still the name most commonly used in Malawi today. In Zambia, the language is generally known as Nyanja or  '(language) of the lake' (referring to Lake Malawi).

Chewa belongs to the same language group (Guthrie Zone N) as Tumbuka, Sena and Nsenga.

Throughout the history of Malawi, only Chewa and Tumbuka have at one time been the primary dominant national languages used by government officials and in school curriculums. However, the Tumbuka language suffered a lot  during the rule of President Hastings Kamuzu Banda, since in 1968 as a result of his one-nation, one-language policy it lost its status as an official language in Malawi. As a result, Tumbuka was removed from the school curriculum, the national radio, and the print media. With the advent of multi-party democracy in 1994, Tumbuka programmes were started again on the radio, but the number of books and other publications in Tumbuka remains low.

Distribution 
Chewa is the most widely known language of Malawi, spoken mostly in the Central and Southern Regions of that country. It is also spoken in  Eastern Province of  Zambia, as well as in Mozambique, especially in the provinces of Tete and Niassa. It was one of the 55 languages featured on the Voyager spacecraft.

History 
The Chewa were a branch of the Maravi people who lived in the Eastern Province of Zambia and in northern Mozambique as far south as the River Zambezi from the 16th century or earlier.

The name "Chewa" (in the form Chévas) itself is first recorded by António Gamitto, who at the age of 26 in 1831 was appointed as second-in-command of an expedition from Tete to the court of King Kazembe in what is now Zambia. His route took him through the country of King Undi west of the Dzalanyama mountains, across a corner of present-day Malawi and on into Zambia. Later he wrote an account including some ethnographic and linguistic notes and vocabularies. According to Gamitto, the Malawi or Maravi people (Maraves) were those ruled by King Undi south of the Chambwe stream (not far south of the present border between Mozambique and Zambia), while the Chewa lived north of the Chambwe.

Another, more extensive, list of 263 words and phrases of the language was made by the German missionary Sigismund Koelle who, working in Sierra Leone in West Africa, interviewed some 160 former slaves and recorded vocabularies in their languages. He published the results in a book called Polyglotta Africana in 1854. Among other slaves was one Mateke, who spoke what he calls "Maravi". Mateke's language is clearly an early form of Nyanja, but in a southern dialect. The same dialect difference survives today in the word  or  "(to) plant".

Apart from the few words recorded by Gamitto and Koelle, the first extensive record of the Chewa language was made by Johannes Rebmann in his Dictionary of the Kiniassa Language, published in 1877 but written in 1853–4. Rebmann was a missionary living near Mombasa in Kenya, and he obtained his information from a Malawian slave, known by the Swahili name Salimini, who had been captured in Malawi some ten years earlier. Salimini, who came from a place called Mphande apparently in the Lilongwe region, also noted some differences between his own dialect, which he called , the "language of the plateau", and the  dialect spoken further south; for example, the Maravi gave the name  to the tree which he himself called .

The first grammar, A Grammar of the Chinyanja language as spoken at Lake Nyasa with Chinyanja–English and English–Chinyanja vocabulary, was written by Alexander Riddel in 1880. Further early grammars and vocabularies include A grammar of Chinyanja, a language spoken in British Central Africa, on and near the shores of Lake Nyasa by George Henry (1891) and M.E. Woodward's A vocabulary of English–Chinyanja and Chinyanja–English: as spoken at Likoma, Lake Nyasa (1895). This has recently (2016) been reissued in a revised and slightly modernised version.

Another early grammar, concentrating on the Kasungu dialect of the language, was Mark Hanna Watkins' A Grammar of Chichewa (1937). This book, the first grammar of any African language to be written by an American, was a work of cooperation between a young black PhD student and young student from Nyasaland studying in Chicago, Hastings Kamuzu Banda, who in 1966 was to become the first President of the Republic of Malawi. This grammar is also remarkable in that it was the first to mark the tones of the words. Modern monographs on aspects of Chichewa grammar include Mtenje (1986), Kanerva (1990), Mchombo (2004) and Downing & Mtenje (2017).

In recent years the language has changed considerably, and a dichotomy has grown between the traditional Chichewa of the villages and the language of city-dwellers.

Phonology

Vowels

Chewa has five vowel sounds: a, ɛ, i, ɔ, u; these are written a, e, i, o, u. Long or double vowels are sometimes found, e.g. áákúlu 'big' (class 2), kufúula 'to shout'. The added 'u' or 'i' in borrowed words such as  'laptop' or  'internet' tends to be silent or barely pronounced.

Consonants

Chewa consonants can be plain (i.e. followed by a vowel), labialised (i.e. followed by w), or palatalised (i.e. followed by or combined with y):

ba, kha, ga, fa, ma, sa etc.
bwa, khwa, gwa, fwa, mwa, swa etc.
bza, tcha, ja, fya, nya, sha etc.

In this scheme, the place of bya is taken by the palatalised affricate bza, and the place of gya is taken by ja, and sya is replaced by sha.

Another way of classifying the consonants is according to whether they are voiced, unvoiced, aspirated, nasal, or approximant:
ba, da, ga
pa, ta, ka
pha, tha, kha
ma, na, ng'a
wa, la, ya

Voiced and aspirated consonants, as well as [f] and [s], can also be preceded by a homorganic nasal:
mba, ngwa, nja, mva, nza etc.
mpha, mfa, nsa etc.

The possible consonant combinations can thus be arranged on a table as follows:

The spelling used here is that introduced in 1973, which is the one generally in use in the Malawi at the present time, replacing the Chinyanja Orthography Rules of 1931.

Notes on the consonants

In most words, Chewa b and d (when not prenasalised) are pronounced implosively, by sucking slightly. However, there is also a plosive b and d, mostly found in foreign words, such as  'bar',  'expensive' (from Afrikaans ) (in contrast to the implosive b and d in native words such as  'wound' and  'which cuts'). A plosive d is also found in  'to stamp (a document)' and  'confident step'.
The affricate sounds bv and pf were formerly commonly heard but are now generally replaced by v and f, e.g.  'problem',  'bone'. In the  dictionary produced by the University of Malawi, the spellings bv and pf are not used in any of the headwords, but bv is used two or three times in the definitions.
The combination bz is described by Atkins as an "alveolar-labialised fricative".
The sounds written ch, k, p and t are pronounced less forcibly than the English equivalents and generally without aspiration. In the combination -ti (e.g. 'how many'), t may be lightly aspirated.
h is also used in Chewa but mostly only in loanwords such as  'hotel',  'horse',  'monthly allowance given to chiefs'.
j is described by Scotton and Orr as being pronounced "somewhat more forward in the mouth" than in English and as sounding "somewhere between an English d and j".
According to the official spelling rules, the sound is written as 'r' after 'i' or 'e', otherwise 'l'. It is also written with 'l' after a prefix containing 'i', as in  'tongue'. 
m is syllabic  in words where it is derived from mu, e.g.  'relative' (3 syllables),  'teacher' (4 syllables),  'he gave him' (5 syllables). However, in class 9 words, such as  'gift',  'plate', or  'witch', and also in the class 1 word  'cat', the m is pronounced very short and does not form a separate syllable. In Southern Region dialects of Malawi, the syllabic m in words like  'lion' is pronounced in a homorganic manner, i.e.  (with three syllables), but in the Central Region, it is pronounced as it is written, i.e. .
In words of class 9, such as  'snake' or  'minister' it is pronounced very short, as part of the following syllable. However, [n] can also be syllabic, when it is contracted from ndi 'it is' or ndí 'and', e.g. 'and to go'; also in the remote past continuous tense, e.g. 'he used to go'.
ng is pronounced  as in 'finger' and ng’ is pronounced  as in 'singer'. Both of these consonants can occur at the beginning of a word:  'kudu',  'cow or ox'.
w in the combinations awu, ewu, iwu, owa, uwa (e.g.  'voice',  'road',  'sound',  'enter',  'flower') although often written is generally not pronounced. Combinations such as gwo or mwo are not found; thus  (short for ) 'he is good' but  (short for ) 'he is bad';  'stone' but  'fire'. 
ŵ, a "closely lip-rounded  with the tongue in the close-i position", was formerly used in Central Region dialects but is now rarely heard, usually being replaced by 'w'. ("It is doubtful whether the majority of speakers have  in their phoneme inventory" (Kishindo).) The symbol 'ŵ' is generally omitted in current publications such as newspapers. In the dialects that use the sound, it is found only before a, i, and e, while before o and u it becomes . To some linguists (e.g. Watkins) it sounds similar to the Spanish .
zy (as in  'be upside down like a bat') can be pronounced .

Tones

Like most other Bantu languages, Chewa is a tonal language; that is to say, the pitch of the syllables (high or low) plays an important role in it. Tone is used in various ways in the language. First of all, each word has its own tonal pattern, for example:
  'person' (Low, Low)
  'dog' (Rising, High)
  'goat' (Falling, Low)
  'maize' (High, Low, Low)

Usually there is only one high tone in a word (generally on one of the last three syllables), or none. However, in compound words there can be more than one high tone, for example:
  'food' (High, High, High; derived from  + , 'a thing of eating')

A second important use of tone is in the verb. Each tense of the verb has its own characteristic tonal pattern (negative tenses usually have a different pattern from positive ones). For example, the present habitual has high tones on the initial syllable and the penultimate, the other syllables being low:
 'I (usually) help'
 'I (usually) go'

The recent past continuous and present continuous, on the other hand, have a tone on the third syllable:
 'I was helping'
 'I was going'
 'I am helping'
 'I am going'

Tones can also indicate whether a verb is being used in a main clause or in a dependent clause such as a relative clause:
 'the week has ended'
 'the week which has ended (i.e. last week)'

A third use of tones in Chewa is to show phrasing and sentence intonation. For example, immediately before a pause in the middle of a sentence the speaker's voice tends to rise up; this rise is referred to as a boundary tone. Other intonational tones are sometimes heard, for example a rising or falling tone at the end of a yes-no question.

Grammar

Noun classes
Chewa nouns are divided for convenience into a number of classes, which are referred to by the Malawians themselves by names such as "Mu-A-", but by Bantu specialists by numbers such as "1/2", corresponding to the classes in other Bantu languages. Conventionally, they are grouped into pairs of singular and plural. However, irregular pairings are also possible, especially with loanwords; for example,  'bank', which takes the concords of class 9 in the singular, has a plural  (class 6).

When assigning nouns to a particular class, initially the prefix of the noun is used. Where there is no prefix, or where the prefix is ambiguous, the concords (see below) are used as a guide to the noun class. For example,  'possessions' is put in class 1, since it takes the class 1 demonstrative  'this'.

Some nouns belong to one class only, e.g.  '' (class 1),  'beer' (class 3),  '' (class 6),  '' (class 14), and do not change between singular and plural. Despite this, such words can still be counted if appropriate:  'two tomatoes',  'two beers',  'one shirt',  'one mosquito'.

Class 11 (Lu-) is not found in Chewa. Words like  'razor' and  'skill' are considered to belong to class 5/6 (Li-Ma-) and take the concords of that class.

Mu-A- (1/2):  pl.  'person';  pl.  'teacher';  pl.  'child'(1a/2):  pl.  'dog'. Class 1a refers to nouns which have no  prefix.The plural  is used only for humans and animals. It can also be used for respect, e.g.  'our teacher'(1a/6):  pl.  'key';  pl.  'dance'(1a):  '';  'luggage, furniture';  'fertilizer' (no pl.)
Mu-Mi- (3/4):  pl.  'village';  pl.  'tree';  pl.  'life';  pl.  'village'(3):  'beer';  'fire';  '' (no pl.)
Li-Ma- (5/6):  pl.  'name';  pl.  'problem';  pl.  'hoe';  pl.  'eye'Often the first consonant is softened or omitted in the plural in this class.(6):  'water',  'medicine',  'place' (no sg.)
Chi-Zi- (7/8):  pl.  'thing';  pl.  'year'(7):  'maize';  'love' (no pl.)
I-Zi- (9/10):  pl.  'house';  pl.  'goat'(10):  'beard';  'relish';  'intelligence' (no sg.)(9/6):  pl.  'bank'
Ka-Ti- (12/13):  pl.  'baby';  pl.  'small thing'(12):  'method of taking care';  'way of dancing' (no pl.)(13):  'sleep' (no sg.)
U-Ma- (14):  'night time';  'farming';  '' (no pl.)(14/6):  pl.  'bow'

Infinitive class:
Ku- (15):  'to see, seeing'

Locative classes:
Pa- (16):  'mouth'
Ku- (17):  'neck'
Mu- (18):  'inside the mouth'

Concords
Pronouns, adjectives, and verbs have to show agreement with nouns in Chichewa. This is done by means of prefixes, for example:
 'this is my child' (class 1)
 'these are my children' (class 2)
 'this is my maize' (class 7)
 'this is my house' (class 9)

Class 2 (the plural of class 1) is often used for respect when referring to elders. According to Corbett and Mtenje, a word like  'father', even though it is singular, will take plural concords (e.g.  'my father is walking, I see him'); they note that to use the singular object-marker  would be 'grossly impolite'.

The various prefixes are shown on the table below:

There are 17 different noun classes, but because some of them share concords there are in fact only 12 distinct sets of prefixes.

Examples of the use of concords
In the examples below, the concords are illustrated mainly with nouns of classes 1 and 2.

Demonstratives 'this' and 'that'
 'who is this?';  'who are these?' (or: 'who is this gentleman?' (respectful))
 'this child';  'these children'
 'that child';  'those children'

The shortened forms are more common.

Pronominal ,  etc.
Prefixed by a supporting vowel, or by  'with' or  'it is', these make the pronouns 'he/she' and 'they':
 'he/she';  'they' (or 'he/she' (respectful))
 'with him/her';  'with them' (or 'with him/her' (respectful))
 'it is he/she';  'it is they'

 'the whole of Malawi'
 'all the children'
 'on his/her own'
 'on their own'
 'that same child'
 'those same children'

In classes 2 and 6,  often becomes  (e.g.  for  etc.).

The commonly used word  'every' is compounded from the verb  'who is' and  'all'. Both parts of the word have concords:
 'every child'
 'every two children'
 'every house' (class 4)
 'every year' (class 7)

Subject prefix
As with other Bantu languages, all Chewa verbs have a prefix which agrees with the subject of the verb. In modern Chewa, the class 2 prefix (formerly ) has become , identical with the prefix of class 1:
 'the child will go';  'the children will go'

The perfect tense ( 'he/she has gone',  'they have gone') has different subject prefixes from the other tenses (see below).

'who'
The relative pronoun  'who' and demonstrative  use the same prefixes as a verb:
 'the child who'
 'the children who'
 'that child'
 'those children'
 'that house'
 'those houses'

Object infix
The use of an object infix is not obligatory in Chewa (for example,  means 'I have bought (them)'). If used, it comes immediately before the verb root, and agrees with the object:
 'I have seen him/her';  'I have seen them' (sometimes shortened to ).

The object infix of classes 16, 17, and 18 is usually replaced by a suffix:  'I have seen inside it'.

The same infix with verbs with the applicative suffix  represents the indirect object, e.g.  'I have written to him'.

Numeral concords
Numeral concords are used with numbers  'one',  'two',  'three',  'four',  'five', and the words  'how many',  'several':
 'one child';  'two children';  'how many children?'

The class 1 prefix  becomes  before :  'two tomatoes'.

The number  'ten' has no concord.

Demonstratives  and 
For semantic reasons, class 1  is rare:
 'that child (the one you know)';  'those children' (those ones you know)
 'this month (we are in)' (class 3);  'these days';  'here in Malawi (where we are now)' (class 17).

Perfect tense subject prefix
In the plural the two prefixes  combine into a single vowel:
 'the child has gone;  'the children have gone'

Possessive concord
 'Mphatso's child';  'Mphatso's children'

The same concords are used in possessive adjectives  'my',  'your',  'his/her/its/their',  'our',  'your (plural or respectful singular),  'their'/'his/her' (respectful):
 'my child';  'my children'

 'their' is used only of people ( is used for things).

 'of' can be combined with nouns or adverbs to make adjectives:
 'an intelligent child';  'intelligent children'
 a good child';  'good children'

 'a beautiful child';  'beautiful children'
 'a thieving child';  'thieving children'

'other' and  'real'
The same  and  concords are found with the words  'other' and  'real'. In combination with these words the plural concord  is converted to :
 'a certain child, another child';  'certain children, other children'
 'a real child';  'real children'

Double-prefix adjectives
Certain adjectives ( 'big',  'small';  'male',  'female';  'long', 'tall',  'short';  'fresh') have a double prefix, combining the possessive concord and the number concord ( or ):
 'a big child';  'big children'
 'a small child';  'little children'
 'a male child';  'male children'
 'a female child';  'female children'

Historic changes
Early dictionaries, such as those of Rebmann, and of Scott and Hetherwick, show that formerly the number of concords was greater. The following changes have taken place:
Class 2 formerly had the concord  (e.g.  'these people'), but this has now become  for most speakers.
'two years'), has now adopted the concords of class 10.
Class 6, formerly with  concords (e.g.  'these eggs'), now has the concords of class 2.
Class 11 had already been assimilated to class 5 even in the 19th century, although it still exists in some dialects of the neighbouring language Tumbuka. 
Class 14, formerly with  concords (e.g.  'my flour'), now has the same concords as class 3.
Class 13 had  in Rebmann's time (e.g.  'these small knives'). This prefix still survives in words like  'sleep'.

In addition, classes 4 and 9, and classes 15 and 17 have identical concords, so the total number of concord sets (singular and plural) is now twelve.

Verbs

Formation of tenses
Tenses in Chichewa are differentiated in two ways, by their tense-marker (or tense-infix), and by their tonal pattern. Sometimes two tenses have the same tense-marker and differ in their tonal pattern alone. In the following examples, the tense-marker is underlined:
 'I am buying'
 'I usually buy'
 'I was buying', 'I used to buy'
 'I will buy (tomorrow or in future)'
 'I will buy (when I get there)'

One tense has no tense-marker:
 'I will buy (soon)'

Tenses can be modified further by adding certain other infixes, called 'aspect-markers', after the tense-marker. These are  'always, usually'  'go and',  'come and' or 'in future', and  'only', 'just'. For example:
 'I am always buying'
 'I went and bought'
 'I just usually buy'

Compound tenses, such as the following, are also found in Chichewa:
 'I have been buying'

Subject-marker
Chichewa verbs (with the exception of the imperative mood and infinitive) begin with a prefix agreeing grammatically with the subject. This prefix is referred to by some grammarians as the 'subject-marker'.
 'we are going'
 (for *) 'the tree has fallen'

The subject-marker can be:
Personal:  'I',  'you (singular)',  'he, she',  'we',  'you (plural or polite)',  'they'; 'he/she (respectful or polite). (In the perfect tense, the subject-marker for 'he, she' is :  'he has gone'.)
Impersonal:  (class 1, 2 or 6),  (class 3 or 14),  (class 4 or 9),  (class 5), etc.

An example of a locative subject-marker is:
 'in the water there are fish'

Both the 2nd and the 3rd person plural pronouns and subject-markers are used respectfully to refer to a single person:
 'you are going' (plural or respectful)
 'they have gone' or 'he/she has gone' (respectful)

Except in the perfect tense, the 3rd person subject marker when used of people is the same whether singular or plural. So in the present tense the 3rd person subject-marker is a-:
 'he/she is going'
 'they are going', 'he/she is going' (respectful)

But in the perfect tense wa- (singular) contrasts with a- (plural or respectful):
 'he/she has gone'
 'they have gone', 'he/she has gone' (respectful)

When the subject is a noun not in class 1, the appropriate class prefix is used even if referring to a person:
 'the chief is going' (class 9)
 'the babies are going' (class 13)

Object-marker
An object-marker can also optionally be added to the verb; if one is added it goes immediately before the verb-stem. The 2nd person plural adds  after the verb:
 'I love you' ( = 'I',  = 'you')
 'I love you' (plural or formal)

The object-marker can be:
Personal:  'me',  'you',  or  'him, her',  'us',  or  'them', 'him/her (polite)'.
Impersonal:  (class 1),  (class 2),  (class 3 or 14), etc.
Locative: e.g.  'you know the inside of the house'; but usually a locative suffix is used instead:  'I have seen inside it'
Reflexive:  'himself', 'herself', 'themselves', 'myself', etc.

When used with a toneless verb tense such as the perfect, the object-marker has a high tone, but in some tenses such as the present habitual, the tone is lost:
 'I have seen him'
 'I usually see him'

With the imperative or subjunctive, the tone of the object-marker goes on the syllable following it, and the imperative ending changes to -e:
 'could you give me some rice?'
 'help me!'
 'you should help him'

Variety of tenses

Chewa has a large number of tenses, some of which differ in some respects from the tenses met with in European languages.

Near vs. remote
There are five time-frames (remote past, near past, present, near future, and remote future). The distinction between near and remote tenses is not exact. The remote tenses are not used of events of today or last night, but the near tenses can sometimes be used of events of earlier or later than today:
 'I bought (yesterday or some days ago)' (remote perfect)
 'I have bought (today)' (perfect)
 'I am buying (now)' (present)
 'I'll buy (today)' (near future)
 'I'll buy (tomorrow or later)' (remote future)

Perfect vs. past
Another distinction is between perfect and past. The two perfect tenses imply that the event described had an outcome which still obtains now. The two past tenses usually imply that the result of the action has been reversed in some way:

Recent time (today):

 'I have bought it' (and still have it) (Perfect)
 'I bought it (but no longer have it)' (Recent Past)

Remote time (yesterday or earlier):

 or  'I bought it' (and still have it) (Remote Perfect)
 or  'I bought it (but no longer have it)' (Remote Past)

When used in narrating a series of events, however, these implications are somewhat relaxed: the Remote Perfect is used for narrating earlier events, and the Recent Past for narrating events of today.

Perfective vs. imperfective
Another important distinction in Chewa is between perfective and imperfective aspect. Imperfective tenses are used for situations, events which occur regularly, or events which are temporarily in progress:

 'I used to buy', 'I was buying (a long time ago)'
 'I was buying (today)', 'I used to buy (a long time ago)'
 'I will be buying (regularly)'

In the present tense only, there is a further distinction between habitual and progressive:

 'I buy (regularly)'
 'I am buying (currently)'

Other tenses
One future tense not found in European languages is the  future, which 'might presuppose an unspoken conditional clause':

 'I will buy' (if I go there, or when I get there)

There are also various  subjunctive and potential mood tenses, such as:

 'I should buy'
 'I should be buying'
 'I should buy (in future)'
 'I can buy'
 'I would have bought'

Negative tenses
Negative tenses, if they are main verbs, are made with the prefix . They differ in intonation from the positive tenses. The negative of the  tense has the ending  instead of :
 'I don't buy'
 'I didn't buy'

Tenses which mean 'will not' or 'have not yet' have a single tone on the penultimate syllable:
 'I won't buy'
 'I haven't bought (it) yet'

They similarly have a single tone on the penultimate syllable:
 'I should not buy'
 'not to buy'

Dependent clause tenses
The tenses used in certain kinds of dependent clauses (such as relative clauses and some types of temporal clauses) differ from those used in main clauses. Dependent verbs often have a tone on the first syllable. Sometimes this change of tone alone is sufficient to show that the verb is being used in a dependent clause. Compare for example:
 'he is buying'
 'when he is buying' or 'who is buying'

Other commonly used dependent tenses are the following:
 'after I bought/buy'
 'before I bought/buy'

There is also a series of tenses using a toneless  meaning 'when' of 'if', for example:
 'when/if I buy'
 'if in future I buy'
 'whenever I buy'
 'if I had bought'

Verb extensions
After the verb stem one or more extensions may be added. The extensions modify the meaning of the verb, for example:
 'buy'
 'buy for' or 'buy with' (applicative)
 'buy for one another' (applicative + reciprocal)
 'get bought', 'be for sale' (stative)
 'cause to get bought, i.e. sell' (causative)
 'be sold (by someone)' (causative + passive)

The extensions  and its intransitive form  are called 'reversive'. They give meanings such as 'open', 'undo', 'unstick', 'uncover':
 'open (something)'
 'become open'
 'break something off'
 'get broken off'
 'undo, loosen'
 'become loose, relaxed'

Most extensions, apart from the reciprocal  'one another', have two possible forms, e.g.
 'fail to happen'
 'cook for someone'
 'sell'
 'melt (transitive)'
 'open'

 'eat with'
 'repeat'
 'come from'

Extensions with o are used only with a monosyllabic stem or one with o:
 'get broken off' 
 'remove grains of corn from the cob'

The extension  with a low tone is causative, but when it has a high tone it is intensive. The high tone is heard on the final syllable of the verb:
 'look carefully'
 'try hard'

The applicative  can also sometimes be intensive, in which case it has a high tone:
 'carry on, keep going'

Verbs with  when they have a stative or intransitive meaning also usually have a high tone:
 'happen'
 'melt (intransitive), get melted'

However, there are some low-toned exceptions such as  'seem' or  'set off'.

Literature

Story-writers and playwrights
The following have written published stories, novels, or plays in the Chewa language:
William Chafulumira
Samuel Josia Ntara or Nthala
John Gwengwe
E.J. Chadza
Steve Chimombo
Whyghtone Kamthunzi
Francis Moto
Bonwell Kadyankena Rodgers
Willie Zingani
Barnaba Zingani
Jolly Maxwell Ntaba

Poets
Jack Mapanje
E.J. Chadza
Benedicto Wokomaatani Malunga
Innocent Masina Nkhonyo

Town Nyanja (Zambia) 

An urban variety of Nyanja, sometimes called Town Nyanja, is the lingua franca of the Zambian capital Lusaka and is widely spoken as a second language throughout Zambia. This is a distinctive Nyanja dialect with some features of Nsenga, although the language also incorporates large numbers of English-derived words, as well as showing influence from other Zambian languages such as Bemba. Town Nyanja has no official status, and the presence of large numbers of loanwords and colloquial expressions has given rise to the misconception that it is an unstructured mixture of languages or a form of slang.

The fact that the standard Nyanja used in schools differs dramatically from the variety actually spoken in Lusaka has been identified as a barrier to the acquisition of literacy among Zambian children.

The concords in Town Nyanja differ from those in Chichewa described above. For example, classes 5 and 6 both have the concord ya- instead of la- and a-; class 8 has va- instead of za-; and 13 has twa- instead of ta-. In addition, the subject and object marker for "I" is ni- rather than ndi-, and that for "they" is βa- (spelled "ba-") rather than a-.

Sample phrases

References

Bibliography 

Atkins, Guy (1950) "Suggestions for an Amended Spelling and Word Division of Nyanja" Africa: Journal of the International African Institute, Vol. 20, No. 3
Batteen, C. (2005). "Syntactic Constraints in Chichewa/English code-switching." 
Bickmore, Lee (2021). "Town Nyanja Verbal Tonology".
Chirwa, Marion N. (2008). Trill Maintenance and Replacement in Chichewa (M.A. thesis, University of Cape Town)
Corbett, G.G.; Al D. Mtenje (1987) "Gender Agreement in Chichewa". Studies in African Linguistics Vol 18, No. 1.
Downing, Laura J.; Al D. Mtenje (2017). The Phonology of Chichewa. Oxford University Press.
Goodson, Andrew, (2011). Salimini's Chichewa In Paas, Steven (2011). Johannes Rebmann: A Servant of God in Africa before the Rise of Western Colonialism, pp. 239–50.

Henry, George, (1904). A grammar of Chinyanja, a language spoken in British Central Africa, on and near the shores of Lake Nyasa.
Hullquist, C.G. (1988). Simply Chichewa.
Hyman, Larry M. & Sam Mchombo (1992). "Morphotactic Constraints in the Chichewa Verb Stem". Proceedings of the Eighteenth Annual Meeting of the Berkeley Linguistics Society: General Session and Parasession on The Place of Morphology in a Grammar (1992), pp. 350–364.
Hyman, Larry M. & Al D. Mtenje (1999a). "Prosodic Morphology and tone: the case of Chichewa" in René Kager, Harry van der Hulst and Wim Zonneveld (eds.) The Prosody-Morphology Interface. Cambridge University Press, 90–133.
Hyman, Larry M. & Al D. Mtenje (1999b). "Non-Etymological High Tones in the Chichewa Verb", Malilime: The Malawian Journal of Linguistics no.1.
Katsonga-Woodward, Heather (2012). Chichewa 101. .
Kanerva, Jonni M. (1990). Focus and Phrasing in Chichewa Phonology. New York, Garland.
Kishindo, Pascal, (2001). "Authority in Language": The Role of the Chichewa Board (1972–1995) in Prescription and Standardization of Chichewa. Journal of Asian and African Studies, No. 62.
Kiso, Andrea (2012). "Tense and Aspect in Chichewa, Citumbuka, and Cisena". Ph.D. Thesis. Stockholm University.
Kunkeyani, Thokozani (2007). "Semantic Classification and Chichewa Derived Nouns". SOAS Working Papers in Linguistics Vol.15 (2007): 151–157.

Lehmann, Dorothea (1977) An outline of Cinyanja Grammar. Zambia 
Mapanje, John Alfred Clement (1983). "On the Interpretation of Aspect and Tense in Chiyao, Chichewa, and English". University College London PhD Thesis.
Marwick, M.G., (1963). "History and Tradition in East Central Africa Through the Eyes of the Northern Rhodesian Cheŵa", Journal of African History, 4, 3, pp. 375–390.
Marwick, M.G., (1964). "An Ethnographic Classic Brought to Light" Africa: Journal of the International African Institute, Vol. 34, No. 1, pp. 46–56.
Maxson, Nathaniel (2011). Chicheŵa for English Speakers: A New and Simplifed Approach. .
 
Mchombo, S. (2006). "Nyanja". In The Concise Encyclopedia of Languages of the World (Elsevier).
Missionários da Companhia de Jesus, (1963). Dicionário Cinyanja–Português. Junta de Investigaçôes do Ultramar.
: The first Chinyanja/Chichewa monolingual dictionary (c.2000). Blantyre (Malawi): Dzuka Pub. Co. (Also published online at the website of the "Centre for Language Studies of the University of Malawi".)
Mtenje, Al D. (1986). Issues in the Non-Linear Phonology of Chichewa part 1. Issues in the Non-Linear Phonology of Chichewa part 2. PhD Thesis, University College, London.
Mtenje, Al D. (1987). "Tone Shift Principles in the Chichewa Verb: A Case for a Tone Lexicon", Lingua 72, 169–207.
Newitt, M.D.D. (1982) "The Early History of the Maravi". The Journal of African History, vol 23, no. 2, pp. 145–162.
Paas, Steven, (2016). Oxford Chichewa–English, English–Chichewa Dictionary. Oxford University Press.
Rebman, John (= Johannes Rebmann), (1877). A Dictionary of the Kiniassa Language. Church Missionary Society (reprinted Gregg, 1968).

Salaun, N. (1993) [1978]. Chicheŵa Intensive Course. Likuni Press, Lilongwe.
Scott, David Clement & Alexander Hetherwick (1929). Dictionary of the Nyanja Language.
Scotton, Carol Myers & Gregory John Orr, (1980). Learning Chichewa, Bk 1. Learning Chichewa, Bk 2. Peace Corps Language Handbook Series. Peace Corps, Washington, D.C. (For recordings, see External links below.)
Simango, Silvester Ron (2000). "'My Madam is Fine': The Adaptation of English loanwords in Chichewa". Journal of Multilingual and Multicultural Development, vol 12, no. 6.
Stevick, Earl et al. (1965). Chinyanja Basic Course. Foreign Service Institute, Washington, D.C. (Recordings of this are available on the internet.)
Wade-Lewis, Margaret (2005). "Mark Hanna Watkins". Histories of Anthropology Annual, vol 1, pp. 181–218.
Watkins, Mark Hanna (1937). A Grammar of Chichewa: A Bantu Language of British Central Africa, Language, Vol. 13, No. 2, Language Dissertation No. 24 (Apr.-Jun., 1937), pp. 5–158.
Woodward, M.E., (1895). A vocabulary of English–Chinyanja and Chinyanja–English as spoken at Likoma, Lake Nyasa. Society for Promoting Christian Knowledge.

External links 

 Tola Akindipe, George Kondowe, Learn Chichewa on Mofeko
 Online English–Chichewa Dictionary
 My First Chewa Dictionary kasahorow
 Chichewa at Omniglot
 English / Chichewa (Nyanja) Online Dictionary 
  Bible, 1922 version digitalized
 Complete Bible (1922, revised 1936) in Nyanja, chapter by chapter
 Buku Lopatulika Bible, 2014 version
 Johnson's 1912 translation of Genesis 1–3 into the Likoma dialect, in various formats
 Johnson's translation of the Book of Common Prayer in the Likoma dialect (1909).
 Holy Quran in Chichewa
 Recordings of pages of Scotton & Orr's Learning Chichewa 
 Willie T. Zingani,  "Come and see" Chichewa book in pdf form.
 Bonwell Kadyankena Rodgers, . Agoloso Presents – Nkhokwe ya Zining'a za m'Chichewa.pdf.
 Bonwell Kadyankena Rodgers, . Agoloso Presents – Mikuluwiko ya Patsokwe.pdf.
 OLAC resources in and about the Nyanja language
Zodiak Radio live radio in English and Chichewa
M.V.B. Mangoche A Visitor's Notebook of Chichewa Elementary phrasebook.
Complete recording of  New Testament (without text)

 
 
Nyasa languages
Languages of Malawi
Languages of Mozambique
Languages of Zambia
Languages of Zimbabwe